De Película Clásico (Classic Films) is a Spanish-language cable channel dedicated to broadcasting movies of the 1930s, 1940s and 1950s and some movies from the 1960s from Mexico's Golden Age, Época de Oro. It is owned by TelevisaUnivision under Televisa Networks.

History
Grupo Televisa (now known as TelevisaUnivision Mexico) launched De Película Clásico on 1994 in Mexico, and later launched in the United States.

External links
 Official site 

Television networks in Mexico
Televisa pay television networks
Movie channels in Mexico
Cinema of Mexico
Television channels and stations established in 1994
Classic television networks